In 2017, former handball coach Ulrik Wilbek became mayor of Viborg Municipality as member of Venstre.  

In this election, he would seek a second term. Venstre would gain 2 seats in the election and the blue bloc parties would win 20 seats, 12 of them from Venstre. Therefore Ulrik Wilbek stood in pole position to continue as mayor. It was eventually confirmed.  

Despite The Alternative suffering nationwide losses in the 2017 Danish Local Elections, they managed to gain a seat in Viborg Municipality, even though their overall vote share decreased.

Electoral system
For elections to Danish municipalities, a number varying from 9 to 31 are chosen to be elected to the municipal council. The seats are then allocated using the D'Hondt method and a closed list proportional representation.
Viborg Municipality had 31 seats in 2021

Unlike in Danish General Elections, in elections to municipal councils, electoral alliances are allowed.

Electoral alliances  

Electoral Alliance 1

Electoral Alliance 2

Electoral Alliance 3

Electoral Alliance 4

Results

Notes

References 

Viborg